Khyapar Gaan (Songs of the Loony) was the last album of the Bengali band Moheener Ghoraguli sompadito seriese. It was released in 1999 by Asha Audio. The song "Tai Janai Gaaney" is based on (both in terms of lyrics and tune) the Jim Croce song "I'll Have To Say I Love You In A Song".

Track listing

External links

1999 albums
Moheener Ghoraguli albums
Bengali-language albums
Asha Audio albums